Kokkalai is one of the business districts of Thrissur city in Kerala state, India. Thrissur railway station, one of busiest and important railway junctions in South India, connecting Thrissur city with the rest of Kerala and India, is situated here. It also houses Thrissur KSRTC Bus Station and a veterinary hospital run by Kerala Veterinary and Animal Sciences University. Hotel Sidhartha Regency and Hotel Casino are in the heart of Kokkalai. This is the southern part of the city.

References

Suburbs of Thrissur city
Shopping districts and streets in India